Harry Shaw (born September 19, 1943) is a Canadian retired professional ice hockey defenceman.

Shaw played 15 seasons of professional hockey, including five seasons (318 regular season and 28 playoff games) in the AHL.

References
 

1943 births
Living people
Canadian expatriate ice hockey players in the United States
Canadian ice hockey defencemen
Dallas Black Hawks players
Ice hockey people from Quebec
Johnstown Red Wings players
Long Beach Sharks players
New Haven Blades players
New Haven Nighthawks players
Phoenix Roadrunners (PHL) players
Phoenix Roadrunners (WHL) players
Rochester Americans players
San Diego Hawks players
Tulsa Oilers (1964–1984) players